Thomas Broughton (1704–1774), was an English clergyman, biographer, and miscellaneous writer, whose works include the libretto to Handel's Hercules.

Life
Broughton was born in London on 5 July 1704, the son of the rector of St. Andrew's, Holborn. He was educated at Eton, before going up to Cambridge in about 1723. There "for the sake of a scholarship he entered himself of Gonville and Caius College." In 1727, after taking B.A., he was admitted to deacon's orders, and in 1728 he was ordained priest, and proceeded to the M.A.

He served for several years as curate of Offley, Hertfordshire, and in 1739 became rector of Stepington, Huntingdonshire; the patron, the Duke of Bedford, also appointing him one of his chaplains. As reader to the Temple, to which he was chosen soon afterwards, he won the favour of the master, Bishop Sherlock, who in 1744 presented him to the vicarage of Bedminster, near Bristol, with the chapels of St. Mary Redcliffe, St. Thomas, and Abbot's Leigh annexed. It was also to Sherlock's influence he owed a prebend in Salisbury Cathedral, on receiving which he moved from London to Bristol, where he died on 21 December 1774.

Writing
He was an industrious writer in many kinds of composition. He published an Historical Dictionary of all Religions from the Creation of the World to the Present Times (1742), a huge work in two volumes folio ; he translated Voltaire's Temple of Taste and part of Pierre Bayle's Dictionary; vindicated orthodox Christianity against Matthew Tindal; converted a Roman Catholic book (Dorrel on the Epistles and Gospels) to Protestant uses; edited John Dryden; wrote in defence of the immortality of the soul; and contributed the lives marked 'T' in the original edition of the Biographia Britannica.

John Hawkins, in his Life of Johnson, credits Broughton with being the real translator of Jarvis's Don Quixote: The fact is that Jarvis laboured at it many years, but could make but little progress, for being a painter by profession, he had not been accustomed to write, and had no style. Mr. Tonson, the bookseller, seeing this, suggested the thought of employing Mr. Broughton . . . who sat himself down to study the Spanish language, and in a few months acquired, as was pretended, sufficient knowledge thereof to give to the world a translation of "Don Quixote" in the true spirit of the original, and to which is prefixed the name of Jarvis.

Broughton, a lover of music, knew Handel, and supplied words for some of his compositions, including a libretto based on Sophocles' Women of Trachis and the ninth book of Ovid's  Metamophises  for the drama Hercules, first performed at the Haymarket in 1745. Handel's biographer, Paul Henry Lang, praises Broughton's libretto for its "good theatrical sense" and the way in which it peels away any extraneous elements of the narrative to concentrate on the central drama of jealousy.

In private life, Broughton was of a mild and amiable disposition, but in controversy, though not discourteous according to the standard of his time, he was very economical in his concessions to his opponents, and he has been characterised in some respects as a weak and credulous writer.

References

Attribution:
 

1704 births
1774 deaths
English biographers
18th-century English writers
18th-century English male writers
People educated at Eton College
Writers from London
English chaplains
Alumni of Gonville and Caius College, Cambridge
English religious writers
18th-century English Anglican priests